Cara Stawicki (born January 29, 1983) is an American rower.

She won a gold medal at the 2019 World Rowing Championships.

References

External links

1983 births
Living people
American female rowers
World Rowing Championships medalists for the United States
21st-century American women